Nicholas John Metz (February 16, 1914 – August 24, 1990) was a Canadian professional ice hockey left winger who played 12 seasons in the National Hockey League for the Toronto Maple Leafs. Metz was the brother of Don Metz.

Awards
Stanley Cup champion in 1942, 1945, 1947, 1948 (Toronto)

Career statistics

Regular season and playoffs

References

External links
 

1914 births
1990 deaths
Canadian ice hockey left wingers
Ice hockey people from Saskatchewan
Toronto St. Michael's Majors players
Stanley Cup champions
Toronto Maple Leafs players
Syracuse Stars (IHL) players
Canadian expatriate ice hockey players in the United States